Roxbury is a historic home located near Oak Grove, Westmoreland County, Virginia.

Overview 
It was built in 1861, and is a two-story, "T"-shaped frame dwelling with a two-bay front section and three-bay rear wing.  It features a one-story front porch supported on coupled, bracketed columns; steeply pitched gable roofs with deep projecting eaves and gables; two large gabled dormers; and sawnwork ornaments.  Each wing has a central chimney with four square stacks joined at their corbelled caps.  Roxbury was built for Dabney Carr Wirt (1814/1815-1888), oldest brother of William Wirt, Jr., builder of Wirtland, and son of William Wirt, the noted jurist, statesman and author.

It was listed on the National Register of Historic Places in 1979.

References

Houses on the National Register of Historic Places in Virginia
Houses completed in 1861
Houses in Westmoreland County, Virginia
National Register of Historic Places in Westmoreland County, Virginia
1861 establishments in Virginia